The prosecutor of the International Criminal Court is the officer of the International Criminal Court whose duties include the investigation and prosecution of the crimes under the jurisdiction of the International Criminal Court, namely genocide, crimes against humanity and war crimes as well as the crime of aggression.

The current prosecutor is Karim Khan, who was elected on 12 February 2021 and took office on 16 June 2021. His predecessor was Fatou Bensouda, who served from 15 June 2012 until 15 June 2021.

List of prosecutors of the International Criminal Court

Elections of the prosecutor 

The first election of the prosecutor took place on 21 April 2003, during the second resumption of the first session of the Assembly of States Parties in New York. The only official candidate was Luis Moreno Ocampo. Moreno Ocampo was elected with 78 votes with no votes against and no abstentions. Nine states parties did not vote.

The second election of the prosecutor took place during the tenth session of the Assembly of States Parties in New York on 12 December 2011. A Search Committee was established which received 52 communications regarding a new prosecutor. In the end, the states parties achieved consensus to elect the then-deputy prosecutor, Fatou Bensouda from the Gambia, as the new prosecutor. She was elected by acclamation.

The third election of the prosecutor took place during the second resumed nineteenth session of the Assembly of States Parties in New York on 12 February 2021. In its second ballot, the Assembly of States Parties elected Karim Ahmad Khan with 72 votes, surpassing the majority requirement of 62. The other three candidates were Carlos Castresana Fernández (Spain), Francesco Lo Voi (Italy) and Fergal Gaynor (Ireland).

References

Prosecutor